Caintigern (died 734), or Saint Kentigerna, was a daughter of Cellach Cualann, King of Leinster. Her feast is listed in the Aberdeen Breviary for 7 January.

Her husband is said to have been Feriacus regulus of Monchestre, who possibly is the same person as Feradach, grandson of Artúr of Dál Riata.

Along with her brother St. Comgán and her son St. Fillan (Fáelán), the widowed Caintigern is said to have lived as a hermit, first in Strath Fillan, then in the Lennox, on the island of Inchcailloch on Loch Lomond.

References

External links
 http://medievalscotland.org/kmo/AnnalsIndex/Feminine/Caintigern.shtml

Sources

 Alan Orr Anderson, Early Sources of Scottish History A.D 500–1286, volume 1. Reprinted with corrections. Paul Watkins, Stamford, 1990. 
 

People from County Wicklow
734 deaths
8th-century Christian saints
Medieval Irish saints
8th-century Irish people
Female saints of medieval Ireland
8th-century Irish women
Year of birth unknown